The second season of the History Channel television series Top Shot, titled Top Shot Reloaded commenced airing on February 8, 2011, and concluded on April 26, 2011. The season contained twelve episodes, and was filmed over a period of 35 days in the fall of 2010 in Santa Clarita, California. The winner of the season was American Chris Reed.

Chris Reed later appeared as a coach in Seasons 3 and 4; George Reinas also appeared as a coach in Seasons 4 and 5.

Brian Zins, Joe Serafini, and Jamie Franks returned for Top Shot: All-Stars. Franks finished in 10th, Serafini finished in 8th, and Zins finished in 4th. According to Colby Donaldson's Twitter, George Reinas was invited to compete as well.

Contestants

Contestant progress

 The player's team (episodes 1–8) won the team challenge.
 The player(s) (episodes 9–12) won the individual challenge.
 The player's team (episodes 1–8) lost the challenge, but the player was not nominated for elimination; or the player (episodes 9–11) did not win the individual challenge but was not nominated for elimination
 The player was nominated for elimination, but won an elimination challenge; or the player (episode 12) was in the bottom two challengers but won a tiebreaker
 The player lost an elimination challenge and was eliminated from the competition.
 The player voluntarily withdrew from the competition.
 The player won the $100,000 grand prize.
 The player came in second.

Episodes

Episode 1: "Sharpshooter Surprise"

No practice sessions were held for the preliminary and team challenges. The trainer for the elimination challenge was Bill Davis, a .44 Magnum expert.

Episode 2: "Shoot or Be Shot"

The trainer for the team challenge was Steve Gilcreast, SWAT firearms trainer and Ranger School graduate. The trainer for the elimination challenge was Michael Friend, machine gun expert.

Episode 3: "Uphill Battle"

The trainer for both challenges was Craig Sawyer, Navy SEALs instructor and former sniper.

Before the start of the team challenge, John withdrew from the competition, citing injuries to both legs. Since this decision left the Blue Team with one extra player, they were allowed to decide for themselves who would be benched.

 There was a second-place tie between Jay and Kyle. It was broken by Maggie's vote.
 Jay and Jermaine each scored 6 points, Jay with 6 "foes" and no "friends," Jermaine with 7 "foes" and 1 "friend." Since Jay hit fewer "friends," he won the challenge.

Episode 4: "Compound Fracture"

The trainer for both challenges was Chris Brackett, a compound bow expert.

Episode 5: "Quickfire Face-Off"

The trainers for both challenges were Simon "J.J." Racaza and Blake Miguez, two contestants from Season 1.

 The RazorCat race gun is named after J. J. "Razor" Racaza. Less than 100 have been made.

Episode 6: "Bury the Hatchet"

The trainer for both challenges was Jack Dagger, primitive weapons expert.

Episode 7: "Trick Shot Showdown II"

The trainer for the team challenge was Steve Doran, firearms instructor. The trainer for the elimination challenge was Taran Butler, national/world pistol champion.

 The daring shot was performed for years by exhibition shooter Bob Geesey, who would shoot a pipe out of his wife's mouth.
 The upside-down shot was performed by Johnny "Cowboy Kid" Baker, who was adopted by Buffalo Bill.

Episode 8: "Catch .22"

The trainer for both challenges was Spencer Hoglund, historical weapons expert and four-time national champion speed shooter.

 There was a three-way tie between Jay, Daryl, and Ashley. Donaldson drew Ashley's name and announced that he would be safe from elimination.

Episode 9: "The 1,000 Yard Shot"
The teams were dissolved in this episode. All players received green shirts and began to compete directly against one another for the rest of the season.

After the individual challenge, all players voted on the nomination range. The top two vote-getters then competed in an elimination challenge as in earlier episodes.

The trainer for both challenges was Ryan Cleckner, former Army Ranger Sniper from 1st Ranger Bn/75th Ranger Regiment and sniper instructor.

 1,000 yards is the longest shot trainees take before graduating from sniper school.

Episode 10: "The Shakedown"

The trainer for both challenges was Iain Harrison, the winner of Season 1.

Episode 11: "Down to the Wire"

The trainer for the individual challenge was Matt Burkett, practical shooting expert. The trainer for the elimination challenge was Cory Kruse, shotgun world champion.

Episode 12: "Season Two Finale"
No practice sessions were held in this episode. The five individual players eliminated prior to the final challenge returned to watch it.

Epilogue: Behind the Bullet
Premiering after the final episode, Top Shot Behind the Bullet, was a one-hour documentary involving behind-the-scene interviews and footage taken before, during, and after the season two competition. At the end of the episode, the show profiled each of the contestants, post-competition.

 Travis Marsh is starting a junior shooting program in his community.
 Athena Lee will compete on the Women's Open Team in Greece.
 John Guida is running the family restaurant and competing locally.
 Jermaine Finks is still working for Homeland Security.
 Maggie Reese will be competing at the World Shoot in Greece.
 Eric Anderson continues to compete in mounted shooting.
 Chris Tilley is competing in world championships.
 Kyle Frasure has been shooting with Maggie and Jay.
 Daryl Parker just published his first novel.
 Jay Lim is still a golf instructor. He hopes to be an NRA certified pistol instructor soon.
 Ashley Spurlin is currently in Afghanistan.
 Jamie Franks has just returned from a deployment in Afghanistan.
 Joe Serafini is back working construction and competing in archery tournaments.
 George Reinas is finishing his Air Force service and is a guest instructor at CPEC.
 Brian Zins is going into production with his own line of ammunition.
 Chris Reed is hoping to teach more people about hunting and marksmanship. He plans on investing his winnings for his kids' education.

Nomination Range

References

2011 American television seasons